The Deviant Strain is a BBC Books original novel written by Justin Richards and based on the long-running British science fiction television series Doctor Who. It was published on 8 September 2005, alongside Only Human and The Stealers of Dreams. It features the Ninth Doctor, Rose Tyler and Captain Jack. It is the first original novel to feature Captain Jack.

Synopsis
The TARDIS lands the Doctor, Rose and Jack at an abandoned Soviet naval base. However, something is still lurking — something which is treating all humans, including Rose and Jack, as prey. But as the Doctor investigates further, he uncovers an experiment years in the making.

Plot

Captain Jack Harkness is in the TARDIS, when suddenly the console starts bleeping. The Doctor and Rose come running in, and he tells them it is a distress call. The bleeping gets louder, and the Doctor says it's all right, because someone has responded to the signal. Rose wonders who, and Jack admits that he did, which means they are morally obligated to investigate. The Doctor says the signal is from Earth - early twenty-first century.

When the TARDIS lands, they find themselves on a cold, windy, snow-covered cliff top with a ring of standing stones. As they look at it, a helicopter rises to cliff level, and soldiers with rifles start to leap out. The soldiers want to know why the Doctor, Rose and Jack are there, so the Doctor pulls out his psychic paper and says that they have orders to be there too. As they are talking, Colonel Levin gets a message that a body (in very bad condition) has been found in the stone circle.

Levin sends someone down to the village (near the submarine base that was abandoned twenty years ago) to fetch a woman named Sofia Barinska, who is the police officer there. She thinks the body is of a boy named Pavel Vahlen, who disappeared the night before. The girl he was thought to be with is still missing. Jack goes with a soldier named Sergeyev to look for her.

Jack and the soldiers fan out in the woods to search, and Jack almost trips over the missing girl. She alive, but her face has become very old, and she is unresponsive. She is helped up, and then Jack supports her out of the woods and back to the circle. Sofia tells them that he name is Valeria Mamentova. She thinks the cause is Vourdulak, a kind of Russian vampire.

They take Valeria and the body to the research institute. There are four people working there: Igor Klebanov (who was there when the base was all but closed down), Alex Minin (who handles that admin side of things, but is hated because he was previously the political officer), and two students who are there as part of their university training, Boris Brodsky & Catherine Kornilova.

The Doctor asks Rose to check out the village, and see what she can find out, so she rides down with Sofia. The village's power comes from the diesel generators on board the subs, and Nikolai Stresnev keeps them running. After talking to Pavel's parents and checking Sofia's house for messages, she and Rose go to the inn. It is a building that used to be the harbormaster's office, but now functions as an inn, community centre, and town hall.

The Doctor has a sample of one of the standing stones and wants to see what it is made of. He is told by Klebanov to ask Minin, and when he visits, realizes the Minin not only keeps the institute supplied, but finds ways to help the villagers too. He also has all the records for the village, going back for many years, including reports of other deaths. Minin sends the Doctor to see Catherine about a microscope.

Catherine helps the Doctor prepare a slide from the sliver of rock that he brought. When they look at it, it resembles a printed circuit, rather than the granite and quartz stone everyone assumed they were.

The Doctor looks at the sample for a long time, then asks for a different one. As Catherine is removing the sliver with tweezers, it falls and she picks it up with her fingers. It turns her fingertips numb, and makes them wrinkled and old looking. The Doctor drops it on his palm, and it does the same to his hand. His skin recovers almost instantly when the sliver is removed, and he tells her that hers will recover in a day or two. He wonders aloud why the energy absorption is tuned to just one strain of DNA life force (noting that he isn't 'close enough').

Meanwhile, Jack and the soldiers have taken Valeria home, and are now checking the submarine pens for radiation.

At the inn, Rose is told that she should visit Georgi, an old blind man who 'sees things.'  He tells Rose that a man with a wolf on his arm will kill him. And then he tells her that there is something in the water, and soldiers on the quay. He 'sees' something with tentacles slither out and kill Nikolai as he goes back to the generator. The lights go out just as Georgi 'sees' Nikolai die.

Rose runs back to the inn to get Sofia, and they both go out to the quay to look for Nikolai. They find him dead, and Jack comes running when he hears her scream. The soldiers try to use their radios, but get nothing but static. One of them says he can fix the generator, and Jack and Sergeyev go with him. Sofia decides that she needs to look at the stone circle again, and Rose comes along.

Jack and the soldiers get the generator repaired, but before they can leave the ship, one of the blue slithery jellyfish creatures comes on board the sub. They are about to climb the ladder and get out, when another shows up. They hide under panels in the floor, and one soldier is found. Jack has Sergeyev hide in a cabin, while he draws the creatures off. He ends up in the torpedo room.

At the stone circle, Sofia says something about systems starting up on their own, which means the stones will always be active, and then she grabs Rose and tries to force her to touch a stone. Rose manages to twist away, and Sofia falls against the stone instead, and becomes very old. Rose runs for the car, and manages to evade Sofia.

Rose drives to the village, and goes to Sofia's home. She finds a chair in the spare bedroom, with pipes and tubes running into the floor and a headpiece above it. She goes back downstairs, following the pipes, and finds a door. She hears Barinska come in, and sees her go to the upstairs spare room, sit on the chair and become young again.

Rose figures out how to open the downstairs door, and finds herself on a set of steps leading down to a tunnel. At the end of the tunnel is a hatch leading into a spaceship. There is another hatch on the other side of the huge room, leading to another tunnel that ends at the sea. She sees a shape coming out of the water, and recognises Jack. She gives him her coat, and they go back into the ship. Jack realises it must be where the signal was coming from. In the ship, the bodies underneath the sheets are part human, part animal.

Sofia opens the hatch and enters the ship. Just as she attacks Rose with a knife, Jack shoots her, then twice more before he grabs Rose's hand and takes her out the door toward the ocean. Just outside the door is a flight of steps. At the top is a door that is blocked by boxes. Someone starts moving them while the two of them shove, and the Doctor and Minin are on the other side.

Jack and Rose take the Doctor down to the ship. He says that the pilot was probably killed when it crashed, but auto-repair fixed the ship. But since nothing happened, the ship still thinks there's something wrong, so it's sending out the signal. It should just collect wind and heat and other energy, but someone tampered with it and now it only takes the life force from humans. The system is really going crazy now, because the ship thinks it's about to be rescued. The only way to stop the process is to drain the power down completely.

Barinska surprises them in the ship. Levin and his men also enter the ship, and she is shot several times. The Doctor leaves through the door leading to her house, and she follows. The Doctor is hoping to get a look at the equipment in her house, but she is following too close, so he runs toward the harbour. He hides, but one of the blue creatures appears, and grabs him. Once again, the ship decides he doesn't like him after all and lets go, and so the creature grabs Barinska instead.

The Doctor, Jack, Rose, Levin and the soldiers go to the inn, where the Doctor tells them (and the villagers still there) about what's going on. As they are discussing what to do, Georgi stumbles in, telling them that the blue creatures are coming to get them. The Doctor says that the ship probably uses a psychic wavelength to communicate with the remotes, and that Georgi might be picking up on it. The Doctor thinks that if that is the case, perhaps Georgi can also send different instructions.

Suddenly, the remotes attack the inn. The villagers, Jack, Rose, Levin and the Doctor manage to escape, and Levin orders the soldiers to go door to door, warn as many of the villagers as they can, and have everyone head for the institute. As the Doctor and Rose head up the hill, Georgi tells Rose 'Don't let him kill me' and when she asks who, he says 'The bad wolf.'  Once at the institute, the soldiers and the fittest of the villagers start to build a bonfire to block the road.

Jack suddenly realises Valeria, whom he has been insistent upon protecting, is not with the procession. Her father, Mamentov, does not care for her at all and has left her behind. Jack perilously runs back to the house, and narrowly rescues her from the blue 'blob' creatures. On the way, he meets with Sergeyev, who has escaped from the submarine. Despite their mutual dislike from the start, Sergeyev saves Jack, and dies saving him and Valeria.

Klebanov suggest that the Doctor take Georgi to the Clean Room, which is a glass cage in a large bare room. The glass is bullet- and blast-proof, and there is an electronic locking system on both of the double doors. It used to be the room where they worked with contagious bacteria. The Doctor seats him in a chair, talks to him quietly, and then puts his fingers to Georgi's temples and puts him into a trance. Rose volunteers to stay with him, but the Doctor asks Minin to stay instead. He asks for the number, so he can call to give new instructions. None of the other phones are working, but Rose's super phone will.

The pile for the bonfire is quite high, and the Doctor tells them to go ahead and light it. The idea is that Georgi is hacked into the system, and can tell the creatures to head straight for the flames, which won't kill them, but will stop them.

As Rose and the Doctor watch the flames, she sees that some are coming around the sides, and the Doctor says that either Georgi isn't succeeding, or Barinska wasn't alone. The Doctor calls Minin and tells him to stop Georgi.

When the Doctor gets to the room, he finds Minin trying to get in the glass cage, but manages to trap himself in the space between the two doors, with no way back to the Doctor, and unable to get through to Georgi. The Doctor tries to use the sonic screwdriver, but it melts the keypad. They manage to rip it out, but the inner door only opens a few inches and then jams. Minin tries to fire a warning shot, or just wound him, but ends up shooting a canister of deadly gas behind Georgi. The old man is killed, and the gas is seeping towards Minin who is trapped. The father of Pavel Vahlen (the boy who was killed at the start) brings his toolbox and reluctantly helps Minin out of the Clean Room.

Most of the creatures are coming around the flames, so everyone retreats into the building, and then barricades all the doors and windows. The Doctor tells them that Plan B is stop the ship, but when they open the hidden door in the storeroom, a creature is on the other side. So they have to create Plan C.

They go back to Minin's office to look at plans for the building. The Doctor points out that all the offices are around the outside of the building, but there is nothing in the center. It's not a covered courtyard, because there are wires and pipes leading inside. They decide to find a way in, as it might be the best place to defend themselves.

Klebanov says that the space was the main lab, and that it was sealed off in the 1950s because of an accident. But they decide to blow a hole in the wall anyway, since they don't have much chance if they don't. The Doctor tells Rose and Jack that the room is safe, because the air conditioning is still connected, so there was never a toxin or a leak.

They blow a hole in the storeroom wall, which lets them into a corridor. They open the door to the lab, turn on the light, bring everyone in, then barricade the door. Inside are skeletal grey figures in lab coats, that begin to move. And then they realise that Klebanov was also working with Barinska. The Doctor glanced at Jack (to let him know he needed to get working on Plan D), and then keeps Klebanov talking.

As the creatures break down the door, the scientists try to drive the villagers toward them, and Jack and one of the soldiers - Lieutenant Krylek - blew a hole in the wall. The Doctor takes the villagers down to the (formerly) dry dock. However, Valeria is left behind, and Jack shouts for Rose to bring her with them. Jack and the soldiers try to keep the scientists at bay, but bullets don't have much effect - only slow them down. Then they suddenly slip away, leaving the soldiers trapped with the blue blobs. The soldiers blow a hole in another wall and escape.

Most of the village's fuel is at the dry dock. They spread it over the ground, planning to light it as soon as the blob creatures get there.

The scientists plan to detonate missiles left on the subs, in order to power up the ship and make all of them young and healthy again. Rose, who has been tailing the group who have taken Valeria as hostage, follows them down the cliffs, and then into a sub.

The Doctor said he was going for a swim, and then reappeared, telling them to be sure to keep a couple of blue blob creatures alive. He says he has been to the ship, and after the majority of the blobs are burned, he wants Jack to run back to the lab with the remaining blobs following. Jack tells him that the scientists are on one of the subs, but all the missiles have been decommissioned - by Klebanov.

The Doctor goes down to the sub with the scientists and Rose, and opens the secondary hatch. He finds Rose, and tells the pursuing Klebanov that it won't work. Just as they are ready to launch a missile, there is a klaxon and a systems failure. The Doctor tells them that he moved the refueling hose to the seawater intake.

Jack gets the blue blobs up to the lab, where they sensed a larger power source and go after it instead of him. Then he runs back to the docks. He bursts into the sub as the klaxon sounds, just in time to see all the scientists sink and lose all their energy. The ship is caught in a loop, and its power is draining away.

Continuity
The Doctor has been able to put people into trances on many occasions, including Terror of the Zygons, The Hand of Fear and later in "Fear Her".
Rose's super phone is used in this story.
The Doctor tells Jack 'This is volcano day all over again,' referring to a conversation in "The Doctor Dances".
Georgi refers to 'the bad wolf' linking it to the Doctor Who season one finale.

The name of this book is the same as the font Deviant Strain used on most Doctor Who merchandise, including the title of the front cover of the book.

See also

Whoniverse

External links

The Cloister Library - The Deviant Strain

2005 British novels
2005 science fiction novels
Ninth Doctor novels
Novels by Justin Richards
Novels set in Russia